Pseudomicrodon is a genus of hoverflies, with 14 known species. All are species with petiolate abdomens.

Biology
Larvae are found in ant nests.

Distribution
They are native to the New World tropics.

Species
Species in Pseudomicrodon include:
Pseudomicrodon auricinctus (Sack, 1931)
Pseudomicrodon batesi (Shannon, 1927)
Pseudomicrodon bellulus (Williston, 1891)
Pseudomicrodon biluminiferus (Hull, 1944)
Pseudomicrodon chrysostypus (Thompson, 2004)
Pseudomicrodon claripennis (Hine, 1914)
Pseudomicrodon conops (Curran, 1940)
Pseudomicrodon corona (Curran, 1940)
Pseudomicrodon nigrispinosus (Shannon, 1927)
Pseudomicrodon pilosops (Marinoni, 2004)
Pseudomicrodon polistoides Reemer, 2013
Pseudomicrodon rheochryssus (Hull, 1944)
Pseudomicrodon seabrai Papavero, 1962
Pseudomicrodon smiti Reemer, 2013

The following are synonyms of other species:
Pseudomicrodon beebei (Curran, 1936): synonym of Pseudomicrodon batesi (Shannon, 1927)

References

Hoverfly genera
Diptera of South America
Microdontinae